Chocos is a breakfast cereal manufactured by Kellogg's and sold in certain European and Middle-Eastern countries as well as India. They are usually shaped in 'scoops'. The usual flavor that they come in is chocolate. There are a variety of flavors and shapes that they come in.

It is a hugely popular cereal in India. The mascot of Chocos in India was Chocos the Bear until 2005 when he was replaced by Coco the Monkey, who is also the mascot of Cocoa Krispies. In Europe, the mascot was substituted in 2009.

The cereal itself is similar to Chocapic. Often, Chocos is involved with promotional styles that utilizes various movie characters, such as Spiderman.

Varieties
Chocos mainly contains seven varieties - Moons and stars, Crunchy bites, duet, a normal choco flavour, Chhota Bheem Chhota Ladoo, Spider-Man Webs and Disney Frozen Magic Hearts. There are also more varieties like Spiderman web chocos across many countries. These are done for promotional activities. Many of these have been discontinued.

References

External links
 
 

Kellogg's cereals